Qağacılı is a village and municipality in the Kurdamir Rayon of Azerbaijan.

References

Populated places in Kurdamir District